In mathematics, Ramanujan's Master Theorem, named after Srinivasa Ramanujan, is a technique that provides an analytic expression for the Mellin transform of an analytic function.

The result is stated as follows:

If a complex-valued function  has an expansion of the form

 

 

where  is the gamma function.

It was widely used by Ramanujan to calculate definite integrals and infinite series.

Higher-dimensional versions of this theorem also appear in quantum physics (through Feynman diagrams).

A similar result was also obtained by Glaisher.

Alternative formalism 
An alternative formulation of Ramanujan's Master Theorem is as follows:

 

which gets converted to the above form after substituting  and using the functional equation for the gamma function.

Proof 
A proof subject to "natural" assumptions (though not the weakest necessary conditions) to Ramanujan's Master theorem was provided by G. H. Hardy employing the residue theorem and the well-known Mellin inversion theorem.

Application to Bernoulli polynomials 
The generating function of the Bernoulli polynomials  is given by:

 

These polynomials are given in terms of the Hurwitz zeta function:

 

Using the Ramanujan master theorem and the generating function of Bernoulli polynomials one has the following integral representation:

 

Application to the gamma function 
Weierstrass's definition of the gamma function

 

is equivalent to expression

 

where  is the Riemann zeta function.

Then applying Ramanujan master theorem we have:

 

Application to Bessel functions 
The Bessel function of the first kind has the power series
 

By Ramanujan's Master Theorem, together with some identities for the gamma function and rearranging, we can evaluate the integral

 

Equivalently, if the spherical Bessel function  is preferred, the formula becomes

 

The solution is remarkable in that it is able to interpolate across the major identities for the gamma function.  In particular, the choice of  gives the square of the gamma function,  gives the duplication formula,  gives the reflection formula, and fixing to the evaluable  or  gives the gamma function by itself, up to reflection and scaling.

Bracket integration method   
The bracket integration method (method of brackets) applies Ramanujan's Master Theorem to a broad range of integrals.   The bracket integration method generates an integral of a series expansion, introduces simplifying notations, solves linear equations, and completes the integration using formulas arising from Ramanujan's Master Theorem.

Generate an integral of a series expansion   
This method transforms the integral to an integral of a series expansion involving M variables, and S summation  parameters, .  A multivariate integral may assume this form.

Apply special notations   
 The bracket, indicator, and  monomial power notations replace terms in the series expansion.   
   
   
 
 
 Application of these notations transforms the integral to a bracket series containing B brackets.
 
 Each bracket series has an index defined as index = number of sums − number of brackets.  
 Among all bracket series representations of an integral, the representation with a minimal index is preferred.

Solve linear equations   
 The array of coefficients  must have maximum rank,  linearly independent leading columns to solve the following set of  linear equations.   
 If the index is non-negative, solve this equation set for each .
  
 If the index is zero, equation simplifies to solving this equation set for each 
 
 If the index is negative, the integral cannot be determined.

Apply formulas   
 If the index is non-negative, the formula for the integral is this form.  
  
 These rules apply.  
 A series is generated for each choice of free summation parameters, .
 Series converging in a common region are added. 
 If a choice generates a divergent series or null series (a series with zero valued terms), the series is rejected.  
 A bracket series of negative index is assigned no value.  
 If all series are rejected, then the method cannot be applied.  
 If the index is zero, the formula  simplifies to this formula and no sum occurs.

Mathematical basis   
 Apply this variable transformation to the general integral form.   
.  
 This is the transformed integral and the result from applying Ramanujan's Master Theorem.
 
  
 The number of brackets (B) equals the number of integrals (M).  In addition to generating the algorithm's formulas, the variable transformation also generates the algorithm's linear equations.

Example   
 The bracket integration method is applied to this integral.  
 
 Generate the integral of a series expansion.  
   
 Apply special notations.  
   
 Solve the linear equation.
   
 Apply the formula.

References

External links 
 
 

Srinivasa Ramanujan
Theorems in analytic number theory